Frank Lindsay Stodart (10 March 1885 – 27 February 1944) was an Australian rules footballer who played with Geelong in the Victorian Football League (VFL).

Notes

External links 

1885 births
1944 deaths
Australian rules footballers from Victoria (Australia)
Geelong Football Club players
People educated at Geelong College